Suhel Tirmizi, also known as M.M. Tirmizi, is a prominent attorney and human rights advocate, practicing at the Gujarat High Court, in India. In December 2009, he was awarded the Minority Rights Award  by the National Minorities Commission for "his efforts for rights of the riot affected in Gujarat."

References

20th-century Indian lawyers
Living people
Year of birth missing (living people)